Jeffrey Sullivan may refer to:

Jeffrey Sullivan (racehorse owner), see American Horse of the Year
Jeffrey C. Sullivan, see Dismissal of U.S. attorneys controversy timeline
Jeffrey Sullivan (ice hockey), played in 1997–98 Ottawa Senators season

See also
Jeff Sullivan (disambiguation)
Geoff Sullivan (disambiguation)